Dimitra is a village of the Deskati municipality. Before the 2011 local government reform it was part of the municipality of Chasia. The 2011 census recorded 357 inhabitants in the village. Dimitra is a part of the community of Karpero.

See also
 List of settlements in the Grevena regional unit

References

Populated places in Grevena (regional unit)